Kinbidhoo School (Dhivehi:ކިނބިދޫ ސްކޫލް) is the school of Kinbidhoo, Thaa Atoll, Maldives.

It was founded on January 8, 1949. The first enrollment was of 98 pupils (52 male and 46 female). The first subjects taught were Class 1: Quran, Arabic, Thaanaliyun (Dhivehi writing) and Class 2: Quran, dheeniyyaathu, akhlaagu, Dhivehi, maths, Arabic, Thaanaliyun (Dhivehi writing). 

The motto of Kinbidhoo School is "Do Till Done".

Schools in the Maldives